Protein phosphatase 1K, mitochondrial is an enzyme that in humans is encoded by the PPM1K gene.

References

Further reading